Mesaieed Industrial Area ( Umm Sa'id Industrial Area) is an industrial area in Al Wakrah Municipality in the State of Qatar, approximately  south of Doha. It is a locality of the city of Mesaieed and was previously a designated district of Mesaieed Municipality before the municipality was merged with Al Wakrah Municipality. 

Both Mesaieed and its industrial area are administered by a subdivision of QatarEnergy called "Mesaieed Industry City Management", which was established in 1996.

History

Mesaieed was established in 1949 as a tanker terminal by QatarEnergy on a previously uninhabited site along the coast. It was chosen by the company because of its proximity to the working population in Doha and Al Wakrah and because of the depth of its waters. It was the only deepwater port in Qatar for more than 20 years. The first industrial facilities prepared on site were oil pumps and oil storage tanks.

A new site for a NGL plant was prepared by QatarEnergy in 1974. Three years later, the site caught fire and was disbanded. Further development by the government was undertaken on Mesaieed from 1975 to 1978. They installed industrial facilities, mechanical equipment and developed the road system at an estimated cost of $200 mn.

Administration
It was administered wholly by QatarEnergy at the time of its inception. The government had agreed to the company's request to allow it full jurisdiction over the area and, until the 1960s, the government had prioritized the development of Doha rather than its natural gas industry. The rapid growth of oil revenues in the 1960s and the accession of Khalifa bin Hamad Al Thani in 1972 resulted in the government assuming a portion of control over the area. In 1970, the first government-prepared industrial site in Mesaieed was created for QAFCO.

In June 2016, it was announced that QatarEnergy would transfer portions of Mesaieed Industrial Area to the Economic Zones Company Qatar (Manateq), effective January 2017. Among the portions ceded to Manateq were the cement area, the light industries area and the medium industries area.

Industry

All the industry concentrated in the area constitutes the core of Qatar's industry.
The area accommodates the main plants of the following companies:

QatarEnergy
QP Refinery
Qatar Lubricants Co.
Qatar Fertiliser Co. (QAFCO)
Qatar Fuel Additives Co. (QAFAC)
Qatar Petrochemical Co. (QAPCO)
Qatar Steel Co. (Qatar Steel)
Qatar Vinyl Co. (QVC)
Qatar Chemicals Co. (Q-Chem)
Qatar Aluminium (Qatalum)
Mesaieed port authority
Container terminal CT7

Flour mill
In 1969, a decision was reached to construct Qatar's first flour mill in Mesaieed. In 1972, the facilities became operational with a capacity of 50 tonnes per day.

Aluminum production
Qatalum, an aluminium smelter plant, was launched in April 2010 in Mesaieed. It is a joint venture between QatarEnergy and Norsk Hydro. Its annual capacity in September 2011 was 585,000 metric tons of primary aluminium. A 1350 MW natural gas power plant has also been built to ensure a stable supply of electricity.

Natural gas liquids
NGL operations began on site in the 1970s.

Oil refineries

The oil refineries in the industrial area have a combined capacity of 137,000 barrels per day.

Nitrogen fertilizers
Urea and ammonia production is regulated by Qatar Fertiliser Company, the only fertilizer producer in the country. The company was established in 1969 by emiri decree. The construction of its processing facilities was completed by 1973. It had a daily production capacity of 900 tonnes of ammonia, with two-thirds of this being used in the manufacture of 1000 tonnes of urea. It was staffed mainly by employees of Norsk Hydro in its initial years, with whom it had signed a long-term cooperation agreement.

Transport

An airstrip was constructed in the 1950s, but it went out of commission during the 1960s.

In its initial years, Mesaieed had imported its machinery through the port of Zekreet. During the 1950s and 1960s, a port was developed in Mesaieed.

Currently, there are two metro stations under construction in the Mesaieed Industrial Area. Both are elevated, were launched in Phase 2B and will be part of Doha Metro's Red Line South. They are located in the Mesaieed Light Industries area and the Mesaieed Heavy Industries area, respectively.

Demographics
As of the 2010 census, the settlement comprised 40 housing units and 57 establishments. There were 123 people living in the settlement, of which 100% were male and 0% were female. Out of the 123 inhabitants, 99% were 20 years of age or older and 1% was under the age of 20. The literacy rate stood at 89.4%.

Employed persons made up 100% of the total population. Females accounted for 0% of the working population, while males accounted for 100% of the working population.

References 

Populated places in Al Wakrah
Populated coastal places in Qatar